The Asociación de Scouts del Paraguay (ASP, roughly Scout Association of Paraguay) is the national Scouting organization of Paraguay. Scouting in Paraguay was founded in 1960 and became a member of the World Organization of the Scout Movement in 1962. The coeducational association has 369 members (as of 2011).

Program sections
Cub Scouts-7 to 11
Scouts-12 to 15
Ventures 16 to 18
Rovers 19 to 22

Scout Motto

Siempre Listo, Always Prepared.

Scout Oath

Por mi honor y por la gracia de Dios prometo hacer todo cuanto de mi dependa para, cumplir com mis deberes para con Dios y la patria ayudar al projimo en todas circunstancias y cumplir fielmente la Ley Scout.

By my honour and God's grace I promise to make everything on my reach to obey my responsibilities with God and my country, help my neighbour in all circumstances and loyally obey the Scout Law.

See also 
 Asociación Guías Scouts del Paraguay

References 

 World Organization of the Scout Movement (1990), Scouting 'Round the World. 1990 edition.

External links 
 Asociación de Scouts del Paraguay

World Organization of the Scout Movement member organizations
Scouting and Guiding in Paraguay
Youth organizations established in 1960